Higor Matheus Meritão (born 23 June 1994) is a Brazilian professional footballer who plays as a defensive midfielder for Liga MX club UNAM.  

He has previously represented a number of São Paulo state clubs in the lower divisions of the Campeonato Paulista, as well as a spell with Botafogo-PB in 2017. He made his debut in the national league in 2018 for Ferroviária in a 2018 Campeonato Brasileiro Série D match against Cianorte on 19 May 2018.

Following his loan move to Botafogo-SP, he made his Campeonato Brasileiro Série B debut as a second-half substitute in the first match of the 2019 season, against Vitória.

References

External links
 

Living people
1994 births
Brazilian footballers
Association football midfielders
Atlético Monte Azul players
Olímpia Futebol Clube players
Associação Esportiva Santacruzense players
Botafogo Futebol Clube (PB) players
Esporte Clube XV de Novembro (Jaú) players
Associação Esportiva Velo Clube Rioclarense players
Associação Ferroviária de Esportes players
Botafogo Futebol Clube (SP) players
Campeonato Brasileiro Série D players
Campeonato Brasileiro Série B players
Footballers from São Paulo (state)
People from Monte Alto, São Paulo